El Parque de la Bombilla is a public park located in the neighborhood of San Ángel, Álvaro Obregón district, south of Mexico City. The park and the monument memorialize revolutionary general and former president of the republic (1920-24) and in 1928 president-elect, Álvaro Obregón, who was assassinated in 1928 while dining at the restaurant "La Bombilla", now the site of the monument. The monument complex opened on July 17, 1935, the seventh anniversary of the assassination by José de León Toral.

History 
On the morning of July 17, 1928, Obregón was invited out to lunch by the deputies of the State of Guanajuato in the restaurant "La Bombilla". The assassin Toral rushed to the scene after several days of surveilling Obregón, and posed as a cartoonist. He drew a picture of several deputies, and Obregón, who was also portrayed. Toral drew his pistol and fired six shots at Alvaro Obregón, who died at the scene. The murderer was quickly arrested and some policemen tried to kill him, but a deputy, Ricardo Topete, saved him arguing the importance of solving the crime.

In 1933 the site was expropriated by the government for a monument. A competition for the commission was held in 1934. The project was designed by architect Enrique Aragón Echegaray. The interior of the building includes an octagonal plan and, on the lower level, included a jar with Obregón's arm that he had lost in battle preserved in formaldehyde.

Construction of the park began in June 1934 during the presidency of General Abelardo L. Rodríguez and opened on the anniversary of the assassination, on July 17, 1935.

Features 

The main element of La Bombilla Park is the monument to Obregón which is at the main entrance starting north, going south. Its location and dimensions of the structure allows a clear visibility and its size emphasizes Álvaro Obregon's importance. The monument occupies a large plaza. 

In 2015 the government of Mexico City started renovating the park, completely renewing the main fountain and adding:
 7 new fountains in surrounding roundabouts 
 24 new trees
 46 new benches 
 143 new lights 
 Fixes to 26,198 square meters of green areas 
 37% additional space for pedestrians, consisting of:
 16 new pedestrian crossings 
 6958 square meters of pedestrian trails

Gallery

References

Parks in Mexico City
San Ángel, Mexico City
Monuments and memorials in Mexico City